Stefanos Xirofotos (born 1 October 1975) is a Greek professional football manager.

References

1975 births
Living people
Greek football managers
Niki Volos F.C. managers
Volos N.F.C. managers
Olympiacos Volos F.C. managers
Super League Greece managers